Marek Gołębiewski (born 18 May 1980) is a Polish football manager and former player who is the current manager of I liga club Chrobry Głogów.

Club career
Gołębiewski started his career with KS Piaseczno in 1997. Then he played for Gwardia Warsaw, Świt Nowy Dwór Mazowiecki, Radomiak Radom, Ruch Wysokie Mazowieckie, Drwęca Nowe Miasto Lubawskie, Sokół Sokółka, Pilica Białobrzegi and several Greek clubs. He ended his career in 2017 playing for Sparta Jazgarzew. In Ekstraklasa he played six games for the Świt, scoring one goal in the 2003–2004 season in the 3–1 loss against Legia Warsaw.

Managerial career

Early career
On 6 August 2020, he became the coach of the third-tier Skra Częstochowa. He made his debut in the Polish Cup match against Stal Stalowa Wola, which Skra lost 1–3. On 17 May 2021, his employment contract was terminated by mutual consent, after the team did not win eight matches in a row. On 24 June 2021, he became the coach of Legia Warsaw II in the fourth division.

Legia Warsaw
He took over as Legia Warsaw's manager on 26 October 2021, following the dismissal of Czesław Michniewicz. At this time, Legia was in fifteenth place in the Ekstraklasa and was in first place in their UEFA Europa League group stage. His first official match was a Polish Cup fixture against Świt Szczecin, with Legia winning 1–0. On 31 October 2021, Legia Warsaw lost 0–2 to Pogoń Szczecin in Gołębiewski's first Ekstraklasa game as manager. On his UEFA Europa League debut, Legia was smashed by Napoli on 4 November 2021 with a 1–4 home defeat.

On 9 December 2021, Gołębiewski's Legia lost 0–1 at home to Spartak Moscow, which left the club in the fourth place in their group, resulting in being eliminated from the UEFA Europa League.

On 13 December 2021, Legia announced that Marek Gołębiewski had resigned after losing 0–1 against Wisła Płock, after which his side fell to the last place in the Ekstraklasa table.

Legia Warsaw II 
In January 2022, he returned to training Legia's reserves. Despite the lack of an official announcement from the club, he appeared in the Legia II squad on the club's official website.

Chrobry Głogów 
On 9 June 2022, he was announced as the new manager of I liga side Chrobry Głogów.

Managerial statistics

References

1980 births
Living people
People from Piaseczno
Association football forwards
Polish footballers
Gwardia Warsaw players
Świt Nowy Dwór Mazowiecki players
Radomiak Radom players
Ruch Wysokie Mazowieckie players
Ekstraklasa players
I liga players
II liga players
III liga players
Polish football managers
Ekstraklasa managers
II liga managers
Legia Warsaw managers
Ząbkovia Ząbki managers